This is a list of notable state-level ornithological organizations in the United States.

 Florida - Florida Ornithological Society
 Georgia - Georgia Ornithological Society
 Hawaii - Hawaii Audubon Society
 Illinois - Illinois Ornithological Society
 Nevada - Great Basin Bird Observatory
 New York - New York State Ornithological Association
 North Carolina - Carolina Bird Club
 South Carolina - Carolina Bird Club
 Tennessee - Tennessee Ornithological Society
 Wisconsin - Wisconsin Society for Ornithology

See also
 List of ornithological societies

References

Ornithological organizations

Ornithological citizen science
Ornithological organizations in the United States
Ornithological